Eric Kiesau (born November 24, 1972) is an American football coach and former offensive coordinator at Auburn University. He was previously the offensive coordinator and quarterbacks coach at Boise State University. Kiesau served as the interim head football coach at Fresno State University for the final four games of the 2016 season after the firing of Tim DeRuyter.

Kiesau followed Bryan Harsin to Auburn as an offensive analyst in 2021. Due to the firing of Cornelius Williams after four games, Kiesau was promoted to wide receivers coach. After forty-five days of Austin Davis as offensive coordinator, Kiesau took over the quarterbacks coach/offensive coordinator duties in 2022. Auburn fired Kiesau on October 31, 2022, along with Harsin and several other staffers.

Head coaching record

Notes

References

External links
 Auburn profile
 Boise State profile

1972 births
Living people
Auburn Tigers football coaches
Boise State Broncos football coaches
California Golden Bears football coaches
Colorado Buffaloes football coaches
Florida Gators football coaches
Fresno State Bulldogs football coaches
Kansas Jayhawks football coaches
Portland State Vikings football players
Utah State Aggies football coaches
Washington Huskies football coaches
Junior college football players in the United States
Coaches of American football from California
Players of American football from Pasadena, California